Permanent Slow Fade were a four-piece guitar band based in London. They were in existence between 1999 and 2001. Consisting of guitar, bass, drums and vocals they were mainly in the indie/dream pop genre. Their vocalist, Brigid Dawson brought a bluesy-style vocal to the music, which also had hints of psychedelia in it, in a similar vein to singers like Grace Slick.

The group disbanded in late 2001 when Dawson returned to California. Thereafter she joined garage rock band, Thee Oh Sees.

A retrospective compilation of their recordings was issued on vinyl in January 2020, entitled "Permanent Slow Fade", consisting of demos and studio recordings.

Discography

Permanent Slow Fade (2020)

External links

1999 establishments in England
Musical groups from London
Musical quartets
Dream pop musical groups
Musical groups disestablished in 2001
2001 disestablishments in England
Musical groups established in 1999